Uttaradit railway station is the main railway station for Uttaradit province. It is owned by the State Railway of Thailand and serves the Northern Line. It is also a Class 1 Station and is also the base for many maintenance subdivisions for the Northern Line.

History

During 1905-1906 King Chulalongkorn planned to build a railway line from Bangkok-Chiang Mai and another from Uttaradit to Ban Krai then across the Mekong River to Luang Prabang. Thus a railway station was built here, and trees were cleared and the land was leveled to await the track-laying process, which happened later in 1907. In 1907, trains hauled rock-filled wagons in which the people saw every day. A railway station was therefore built in the forest cemetery of Wat Tha Thanon (now known as Uttaradit Station) in 1909 and was finished in 1910. The first Uttaradit Station was built in the Modernist Style of Jugendstil with a tower in the middle, designed and built by German architect Karl Siegfried Döhring. However, the tower was destroyed during World War II. The station was rebuilt after the war and opened for service once again in 1951. Due to an increase of train traffic, a new station had to be built 2.35 kilometres north and was finished in 1958, it was called Sila At Station.

Today Uttaradit Station is kept as an OTOP centre and there have been plans of expanding the station building into a department store.

Sub-divisions
These are the sub-divisions within the area of Uttaradit railway station:
 Uttaradit Branch of Railcars Department
 Uttaradit Branch Sector 3 of Mechanical Department
 Uttaradit Branch of Locomotives Department
 Uttaradit Locomotive Depot
 Uttaradit Public Administration of the Ministry of Commerce
 Uttaradit Branch of Railway Medical Unit
 Uttaradit Branch Railway's Labour Union
 Uttaradit Station Signal Control Box
 Uttaradit Tourist Information Centre and Centre for OTOP Products

Train services
Local 407/408 Nakhon Sawan-Chiang Mai-Nakhon Sawan
Local 403 Phitsanulok-Sila At-Phitsanulok
Rapid 111/112 Bangkok-Den Chai-Bangkok
Special Express 9/10 Bangkok-Chiang Mai-Bangkok
Rapid 109 Bangkok-Chiang Mai
Special Express 13/14 Bangkok-Chiang Mai-Bangkok
Rapid 105/106 Bangkok-Sila At-Bangkok
Rapid 107/108 Bangkok-Den Chai-Bangkok
Express 51/52 Bangkok-Chiang Mai-Bangkok
Special Express 3/4 Bangkok-Sawankhalok/Sila At-Bangkok
Local 410 Sila At-Phitsanulok
Rapid 102 Chiang Mai Bangkok

References

Railway stations in Thailand
Art Nouveau architecture in Thailand
Art Nouveau railway stations
Railway stations opened in 1910